The Mario Negri Institute for Pharmacological Research is a nonprofit research institute dedicated to clinical and biomedical research. It was made possible by a special bequest of Milan philanthropist Mario Negri (1891 – 1960). It was founded in 1961 although it started working in Milan from 1st Feb 1963. There are branches of the institute in Bergamo, Ranica (BG), and at Santa Maria Imbaro, near Chieti.

Founder and director from 1961 to 2018 was Silvio Garattini.

Giuseppe Remuzzi has been the director since 2018.

An understanding of the history and aims of the institute can be found in “ Good Pharma-the Public Health Model of the Mario Negri Institute” Donald W Light and Antonio F   2015

See also 

 Centro Studi GISED

External links
 Official Site
 The Mario Negri Institute for Pharmacological Research
 Il Cavaliere Mario Negri: il fondatore
 prof. Silvio Garattini. Curriculum Vitae

Medical research institutes in Italy
Medical and health organisations based in Italy